The simple-station Calle 34 is part of the TransMilenio mass-transit system of Bogotá, Colombia, opened in the year 2000.

Location
The station is located close to downtown Bogotá, specifically on Avenida Caracas between Calles 32 and 34.

History
In 2000, phase one of the TransMilenio system was opened between Portal de la 80 and Tercer Milenio, including this station.

The station serves the Teusaquillo, Samper, and Sagrado Corazón neighborhoods.

As of March 2019 changed the name of Calle 34 to the current name.

Station services

Old trunk services

Main line service

Feeder routes
This station does not have connections to feeder routes.

Inter-city service
This station does not have inter-city service.

See also
 List of TransMilenio Stations

References

External links
 

TransMilenio